North Leitrim was a parliamentary constituency in Ireland. From 1885 to 1918 it returned one Member of Parliament (MP) to the House of Commons of the United Kingdom of Great Britain and Ireland.

Prior to the 1885 United Kingdom general election and after the dissolution of Parliament in 1918 the area was part of the Leitrim constituency.

Boundaries
This constituency comprised the northern part of County Leitrim.

1885–1918: The baronies of Dromahair and Rosclogher, and that part of the barony of Leitrim contained within the parish of Kiltubbrid and the townlands of Acres, Aghagrania, Aghnagollop, Ardcolum, Barnameenagh, Barnameenagh West, Blackrock, Carrickbaun, Carricknabrack, Corlough, Corloughlin, Cormeeltan, Cormongan, Cornamuddagh, Cornashamsoge, Corrachuill, Corryard, Creenagh, Crey, Derrintober, Derrintonagh, Derryhallagh, Derrynaseer, Derryteigeroe, Dorrusawillin, Dristernaun, Drumcoora, Drumcroman, Drumderg, Drumhalwy, Drumduff, Drumshanbo, Greaghfarnagh, Greaghnaguillaun, Largan, Largan Mountain, Lavaur, Mahanagh, Moneynure, Murhaun, Roscunnish, Shancurry and Sheskinacurry in the parish of Kiltoghert.

Members of Parliament

Elections

Elections in the 1880s

Elections in the 1890s

Elections in the 1900s

McHugh is unseated after being adjudicated bankrupt, but then wins the seat again at a by-election.

McHugh is also elected MP for Sligo North and opts to sit there, causing a by-election.

Dolan resigns, causing a by-election, in which he stood again as a Sinn Féin candidate.

Elections in the 1910s

References

Westminster constituencies in County Leitrim (historic)
Constituencies of the Parliament of the United Kingdom established in 1885
Constituencies of the Parliament of the United Kingdom disestablished in 1918